Carolina Castillo Hidalgo (born 4 November 1990 in Cali) is a Colombian freestyle wrestler. She competed in the freestyle 48 kg event at the 2012 Summer Olympics and was eliminated in the qualifications by Davaasükhiin Otgontsetseg.  She competed in the same event at the 2016 Summer Olympics, beating Chov Sotheara before losing to Elitsa Yankova in the quarterfinals.

In 2020, she competed in the 2020 Pan American Wrestling Olympic Qualification Tournament, held in Ottawa, Canada, without qualifying for the 2020 Summer Olympics in Tokyo, Japan.

References

External links
 

1990 births
Living people
Colombian female sport wrestlers
Olympic wrestlers of Colombia
Wrestlers at the 2012 Summer Olympics
Wrestlers at the 2016 Summer Olympics
Sportspeople from Cali
Pan American Games medalists in wrestling
Pan American Games bronze medalists for Colombia
Wrestlers at the 2015 Pan American Games
South American Games gold medalists for Colombia
South American Games medalists in wrestling
Competitors at the 2014 South American Games
Wrestlers at the 2019 Pan American Games
Medalists at the 2015 Pan American Games
Medalists at the 2019 Pan American Games
Pan American Wrestling Championships medalists
21st-century Colombian women